A social enterprise is an organization that applies commercial strategies to maximize improvements in financial, social and environmental well-being. This may include maximizing social impact alongside profits for co-owners.

Social enterprises can be structured as a business, a partnership for profit or non-profit, and may take the form (depending on in which country the entity exists and the legal forms available) of a co-operative, mutual organisation, a disregarded entity, a social business, a benefit corporation, a community interest company, a company limited by guarantee or a charity organisation. They can also take more conventional structures.

Social enterprises have business, environmental and social goals. As a result, their social goals are embedded in their objective, which differentiates them from other organisations and companies. A social enterprise's main purpose is to promote, encourage, and make social change. Social enterprises are businesses created to further a social purpose in a financially sustainable way. Social enterprises can provide income generation opportunities that meet the basic needs of people who live in poverty. They are sustainable, and earned income from sales is reinvested in their mission. They do not depend on philanthropy and can sustain themselves over the long term. Their models can be expanded or replicated to other communities to generate more impact.

A social enterprise can be more sustainable than a nonprofit organisation that may solely rely on grant money, donations or government policies alone.

Types 

Social enterprises are dynamic, requiring adaptation to ensure they meet the needs of communities and individuals in an ever-changing world. Their shared common thread is that they all operate to achieve a balanced financial, social and environmental set of objectives.

Trading enterprises 
Worker/employee-owned trading enterprises, co-operatives, and collectives. These vary from very large enterprises such as John Lewis Partnership in the UK and the Mondragon Corporation in Spain to medium-sized enterprises owned by their staff with traditional management hierarchies and pay differentials, to quite small worker cooperatives with only a few director/employees who work in less hierarchical ways and practice wage parity. Within the trading enterprises, there are employee-owned enterprises and membership-owned enterprises.

Financial institutions 
Saving and loans organisations such as credit unions, micro credit organisations, cooperative banks and revolving loan funds are membership-owned social enterprises. Credit unions were first established in the 1850s in Germany and spread internationally. Cooperative banks have likewise been around since the 1870s, owned as a subsidiary of a membership co-operative. In recent times micro credit organisations have sprung up in many developing countries to great effect. Local currency exchanges and social value exchanges are also being established.

Community organisations 
Many community organisations are registered social enterprises: community enterprises, housing co-operatives and community interest companies with asset locks, community centres, pubs and shops, associations, housing associations and football clubs. These are membership organisations that usually exist for a specific purpose and trade commercially. All operate to re-invest profits into the community. They have large memberships who are customers or supporters of the organisation's key purpose. There are village co-operatives in India and Pakistan that were established as far back as 1904.

Non-governmental organisations (NGOs) and charities 
There are many NGOs and charities that operate a commercial consultancy and training enterprise, or subsidiary trading enterprises, such as Oxfam International. The profits are used to provide salaries for people who provide free services to specific groups of people or to further the social or environmental aims of the organisation.

History

Origins 
The idea of a social enterprise as a distinct concept first developed in the late 1970s in the UK as an alternative commercial organisational model to private businesses, co-operatives and public enterprise. The concept, at that time, had five main principles  divided into three values and two paradigm shifts. The two paradigm shifts were:

 A common ownership legal structure where members/owners have one voting share and different forms of investment
 Democratic governance, where each worker/community resident is a member with one vote

The three principles, now referred to as the triple bottom line were:

 Trading and financially viable independence
 Creating social wealth
 Operating in environmentally responsible ways

Furthermore, it was intended as part of the original concept that social enterprises should plan, measure and report on financial performance, social-wealth creation, and environmental responsibility by the use of a social accounting and audit system.

The organisational and legal principles embedded in social enterprises are believed to have come from non-profit organisations. Originally, non-profit organisations relied on governmental and public support, but more recently they have started to rely on profits from their own social change operations. The Social Enterprise Alliance (SEA) defines the following as reasons for this transition:

 the increase in non-profit operating costs
 the decline in government and public philanthropic support
 increased competition due to growth in the charitable sector
 the expansion in the demand for non-profit provided services

Social enterprises are viewed to have been created as a result of the evolution of non-profits. This formation process resulted in a type of hybrid organisation that does not have concrete organisational boundaries. Various scholars (e.g. Eikenberry & Kluver, Liu & Ko, and Mullins et al.) have argued that this may have come about due to the marketization of the non-profit sector, which resulted in many non-profit firms placing more focus on generating income. Other scholars have used institutional theory to conclude that non-profits have adopted social enterprise models, because such models have become legitimized and widely accepted. Some organizations have evolved into social enterprises, while some were established as social enterprises.

Social enterprise has a long history around the world, though under different names and with different characteristics.

The first description of a social enterprise as a democratically owned and run trading organisation that is financially independent, has social objectives and operates in an environmentally responsible way, was put forward by Freer Spreckley in the UK in 1978 and later written as a publication in 1981. One of the first examples of a social enterprise, in the form of a social cooperative, can be traced back to the Victorian era. Like social cooperatives, social enterprises are believed to have emerged as a result of state and market failure. However, market failure is emphasized in the UK, while state failure is emphasized in the United States.

Muhammad Yunus 
Muhammad Yunus (Grameen Bank founder and 2006 Nobel Peace Prize laureate) used the term "social enterprise" in his book Banker to the Poor, published in 2009. Muhammad Yunus used the term referring to microfinance. His work in the area of lending money to women, who would never receive a regular bank loan, led to him to receive the Nobel Peace Prize in 2006.

Adoption of social enterprise across institutions 
In the US, Harvard, Stanford and Princeton universities built on the work of Ashoka, and each made contributions to the development of the social entrepreneurship field through project initiatives and publications.

 the field of social enterprise studies has not yet developed firm philosophical foundations, but its advocates and its academic community are much more engaged with critical pedagogies (e.g. Paulo Freire) and critical traditions in research (e.g. critical theory / institutional theory / Marxism) in comparison to private-sector business education.
Teaching related to the social economy draws explicitly from the works of Robert Owen, Proudhon and Karl Marx, with works by Bourdieu and Putnam informing the debate over social capital and its relationship to the competitive advantage of mutuals. This intellectual foundation, however, does not extend as strongly into the field of social entrepreneurship, where there is more influence from writings on liberalism and entrepreneurship by Joseph Schumpeter, in conjunction with the emerging fields of social innovation, actor–network theory and complexity theory to explain its processes.

Social enterprise (unlike private enterprise) is not taught exclusively in a business school context, as it is increasingly connected to the health sector and to public-service delivery. However, Oxford University's Said Business School does host the Skoll World Forum, a global event focused on social entrepreneurs.

Publications 
The first international social-enterprise journal was established in 2005 by Social Enterprise London (with support from the London Development Association). The Social Enterprise Journal has been followed by the Journal of Social Entrepreneurship, and coverage of issues pertaining to the social economy and social enterprise are also covered by the Journal of Co-operative Studies and by the Annals of Co-operative and Public Economics. The European Social Enterprise Research Network (EMES) and the Co-operative Research Unit (CRU) at the Open University have also published research into social enterprise. The Skoll World Forum, organised jointly by Oxford and Duke universities, brings together researchers and practitioners from across the globe.

Terminology 
The term 'social enterprise' has a mixed and contested heritage due to its philanthropic roots in the United States, and cooperative roots in the United Kingdom, European Union and Asia. In the US, the term is associated with 'doing charity by doing trade', rather than 'doing charity while doing trade'. In other countries, there is a much stronger emphasis on community organizing and democratic control of capital and mutual principles, rather than philanthropy. In recent years, there has been a rise in the concept of social purpose businesses which pursue social responsibility directly, or raise funds for charitable purposes.

Muhammad Yunus, founder of the Grameen Bank, believes that a social enterprise should be modeled exclusively to achieve a social goal. Another view is that social enterprises should not be motivated by profit, rather profit motives should be secondary to the primary social goal. A second definition provided by The Social Enterprise Alliance (SEA) defines a social enterprise to be an organization that uses business methods to execute its social/environmental mission. According to this definition, the social enterprise's social mission is to help the disadvantaged, which is executed by directly providing goods or services (not money). Additionally, earned revenue must be the main source of income for the organization/venture. A third definition is purely based on how the organisation is legally structured, or formed as a legal entity. In this context, a social enterprise is a legal entity that through its entity choice chooses to forgo a profit motive. A fourth definition asserts that a social enterprise consists of a community of dedicated individuals that are continuously thinking about social impact, and as a result employ business and management techniques to approach social causes.

Social enterprise versus nonprofit 
Social enterprises are not only a structural element of a non-profit. A large portion of social enterprises are non-profits; however, there are also for-profit social enterprises. Social enterprises are often regarded—erroneously—as nonprofit organisations, although many do take on a nonprofit legal form and are treated in academic literature on the subject as a branch or sub-set of nonprofit activity (especially when contrasted with Social Businesses). Social enterprises in the nonprofit form can earn income for their goods or services; they are typically regarded as non-profits that use business strategies to generate revenue to support their charitable missions.

In recent years, many non-profits have chosen to take on social enterprise models as it has become increasingly difficult to obtain financing from outside sources. The social enterprise model offers non-profit organisations an alternative to reliance on charitable donations. This may allow them to increase their funding and sustainability, and assist them in the pursuit of their social mission. However, two potential issues emerge: 1) distraction from the social goal in pursuit of a contradictory business activities and 2) inadequate skills, resources, and capabilities for the adoption of the social enterprise model.

Social enterprise versus corporate social responsibility 
Many commercial enterprises would consider themselves to have social objectives, but commitment to these objectives is motivated by the perception that such commitment will ultimately make the enterprise more financially valuable. These are organisations that might be more properly said to be operating corporate responsibility policies. Social enterprises differ in that their commitment to impact is central to the mission of the business. Some may not aim to offer any benefit to their investors, except where they believe that doing so will ultimately further their capacity to realize their social and environmental goals, although there is a huge amount of variation in forms and activities.

Corporate social responsibility (CSR) is a practice that businesses can use to be conscious of the social and environmental impacts their activities make. There are a variety of CSR markers, such as accountability and internal/external elements. Social enterprises place a lot of emphasis on external social responsibility as a result of their social objectives, so social impact is built into the organisation. However, there had been debate on whether or not social enterprises place enough emphasis on internal CSR. Internal CSR includes human resources/capital management, health and safety standards, adaptation to innovation and change, and the quality of management within the organisation. Since a large majority of social enterprises do not have sufficient funding, they are unable to pay competitive wages to their employees, and as a result they have to resort to other (non-financial) techniques to recruit employees. Many managers utilize the social component of the social enterprise's dual mission/purpose for this.

Social enterprise versus social entrepreneurship 
Like social enterprise, social entrepreneurship has a variety of existing definitions. Currently there is not a widely accepted, standard definition for the term, and descriptions vary in level of detail. There is an emphasis on change agents for social entrepreneurship, in contrast to the organizational focus of social enterprises. Social entrepreneurship usually takes place in the non-profit sector, with a focus on creating and implementing new solutions.

Social impact versus social enterprise 
Social impact and social enterprise are not the same. Social impact may refer to the overall effects of a business, but a business that has social impact may or may not be a social enterprise. Social enterprises have socially bound mission statements and operate with the goal of solving a social problem as a part of their mission. Social enterprise has emerged as a businesslike contrast to the traditional nonprofit organization. Social enterprise is going to continue its evolution away from forms that focus on broad frame-breaking and innovation to a narrower focus on market-based solutions and businesslike solutions to measure social impact of programs.

Social enterprise funding 
Socially responsible investing (SRI) seeks to maximize both financial gain and social impact.

Social Enterprises often use for-profit business strategies to fund their social change. The methods in which these Social Enterprise's create sustainable revenue streams differ from social business to social business, but all share the goal of abandoning the need for government or donor support. Gregory Dees and Beth Anderson discuss this difference in funding strategies as the innovation that differentiates the social enterprise from the traditional non-profit actor.

Salesforce.com trademark dispute 
In 2012 Social Enterprise UK ran the 'Not In Our Name' campaign against Salesforce.com, a global software and CRM company, that had begun using the term 'social enterprise' to describe its products and had applied for 'social enterprise' trademarks in the EU, US, Australia, and Jamaica. The campaign was supported by similar organisations in the US (the Social Enterprise Alliance), Canada, South Africa, and Australia. An open letter was sent to the CEO and Chairman of Salesforce.com asking Salesforce.com to stop using the term 'social enterprise'. It was signed by people and organisations around the world, including Muhammad Yunus (Grameen Bank founder and Nobel Peace Prize laureate), Richard G. Wilkinson and Kate Pickett (co-authors of The Spirit Level). Salesforce said they would withdraw applications to trademark the term 'social enterprise', and remove any references to 'social enterprise' in its marketing materials in the future.

Hybrid forms 
Organizations that do not take the distinct form of either a private, public, or non-profit organization are classified as hybrid organizations. For legal and tax purposes, hybrid forms are classified as for-profit entities. The two main types of hybrid organizations are the L³C, or low-profit limited liability company, and the benefit corporation (B-Corp). A L³C's main objective is to achieve socially beneficial goals. They are able to go about achieving these goals by employing the financial and flexible advantages of a limited liability company. States that have authorized the use of the L³C model have established three requirements: to operate for charitable or educational purposes, not the production of income, and not the fulfillment of a political or legislative agenda. A benefit corporation, or B-Corp, is a corporation that operates to achieve/create a "general public benefit".

Influences 
The first academic paper to propose worker co-operatives involved in health and rehabilitation work as a form social enterprise was published in 1993. The scale and integration of co-operative development in the 'red belt' of Italy (some 7,000 worker, and 8,000 social co-operatives) inspired the formation of the EMES network of social economy researchers who subsequently spread the language to the UK and the rest of Europe through influential English language publications.

Current debates 
When social enterprise first emerged, much of the scholarly literature focused on defining the key characteristics and definitions of social enterprise. Currently there is more literature and research on the emergence of the social enterprise sector, as well as the internal management of social enterprise organizations. Due to the dual purpose missions of social enterprises, organizations cannot directly employ the typical management strategies of established business models. Recent academic literature has argued against prior positively held views of social enterprises success in striking a balance between the two tensions, and instead arguing that the social mission is being compromised in favor of financial stability. Prioritizing social good over financial stability contradicts rational firm management, which typically prioritizes financial and profit-seeking goals. As a result, different management issues arise that range from stakeholders (and management) agreeing on the firm's goals, but disagreeing on an action plan; to management and stakeholders disagreeing on the firm's goals. Some social enterprises have taken on same-sector and cross-sector partnerships, while others continue to operate independently.

Types of tensions in social enterprise management 

Tensions are separated into four distinct categories: performing, organizing, belonging, and learning.

 Performing tensions arise as organizations seek to fulfill various conflicting goals such as varying stakeholder demands, social mission goals, and performance metrics. A major challenge is figuring out how to gauge success with conflicting goals.
 Organizing tensions are caused by inconsistencies in organizational structure, culture, and human resource practices. Many social organizations grapple with whom to hire, as many want to help disadvantaged people, but also need workers with business skills to ensure the success of the enterprise. Organizations face the challenge of deciding on which organizational structure and legal form (e.g. Non-Profit, for Profit) to operate under.
 Belonging tensions arise from identification or a sense of belonging to contrasting goals and values, which creates internal organization conflict. These tensions are amplified with the maintenance of relationships with stakeholders who may have conflicting identities from the organization.
 Learning tensions are a result of conflicting time horizons (i.e. short term vs. long-run). In the short term, organizations aim for stability which can be evaluated based on metrics such as costs, profits, and revenues, but in the long run they want growth, flexibility, and progress in achieving their social mission.

In Australia 
While the terminology of ‘social enterprise’ is new in Australia, the contemporary values, principles and practices of social enterprise are strongly aligned with the culture and lore of Australia's first peoples, which has been practiced for over 60,000 years. Similarly, social enterprise practices were common in the establishment of Australia's immigrant populations. Australia's suburban landscape is marked by clubs and associations that operate hospitality, learning or community-oriented enterprises together with inclusive and culturally strengthening employment practices.

The forms social enterprises can take and the industries they operate in are so many and various that it has always been a challenge to define, find and count social enterprises. In 2009 Social Traders partnered with the Australian Centre for Philanthropy and Nonprofit Studies (ACPNS) at Queensland University of Technology to define social enterprise and, for the first time in Australia, to identify and map the social enterprise sector: its scope, its variety of forms, its reasons for trading, its financial dimensions, and the individuals and communities social enterprises aim to benefit.

This Finding Australia's Social Enterprise Sector (FASES) project produced its final report in June 2010. The project was led by Professor Jo Barraket, an Australian social enterprise academic. One of the key features of this Australian research is its intention to define social enterprise in a way that was informed by and made sense to those working in or with social enterprises. The research design therefore included workshops to explore and test what social enterprise managers, researchers, and relevant policy makers meant by the term 'social enterprise'. This was the resulting definition: Social enterprises are organisations that are:

 led by an economic, social, cultural, or environmental mission consistent with a public or community benefit
 derive a substantial portion of their income from trade
 reinvest the majority of their profit/surplus in the fulfilment of their mission

Map for Impact research 
In 2017, the Centre for Social Impact at Swinburne University undertook a comprehensive mapping project of social enterprise in Victoria. The ‘Map for Impact’ Report identified 3,500 social enterprises in Victoria alone, employing over 60,000 people or 1.8% of the state's workforce.

Victoria's social enterprises contribute over $5.2 billion in gross output to Victoria's economy. Social enterprise is a significant contributor to the economy - from local manufacturing and agriculture, to hospitality and professional services - they are not only local enterprises serving local needs, nearly one-third trade internationally.

Unlike traditional commercial businesses, Victorian social enterprises are intentionally labour-intensive, with the proportion of their labour force equating to approximately twice the proportion of Gross State Product they produce.

20% of Victoria's social enterprise workforce is people with disability (i.e. 12,000 jobs) and 7% of jobs are held by people previously experiencing long-term unemployment.

Swinburne University estimates that there are over 20,000 social enterprises nationally. Based on its Victorian analysis, it can be extrapolated that:

 Social enterprise contributes $29.7 billion to the national economy 
 Social enterprise employs 340,000 people nationally.
Following the ‘Map for Impact’ the Victorian Government has commissioned further research and digital platforms to support collection and sharing of social enterprise research and knowledge. The Social Entrepreneur Evidence Space (SEES) is an open research platform for Australia's social enterprise community.

Social enterprise practitioner networks 
Social enterprise practitioners have formed professional networks in each State and Territory of Australia. In 2020, they joined to form a national voice for the sector, the Alliance of Social Enterprise Networks Australia (ASENA). ASENA has provided a federal channel for advocacy, collaboration and resource sharing for the emergent community of networks.

ASENA brings together representatives from the social enterprise networks in Australia:

 Social Enterprise Network Victoria (SENVIC)
 Social Enterprise Council NSW and ACT (SECNA)
 Queensland Social Enterprise Council (QSEC)
 South Australian Social Enterprise Council (SASEC)
 West Australian Social Enterprise Council (WASEC)
 Social Enterprise Network Tasmania (SENTAS)
 Impact North (Northern Territory).

Social enterprise networks create a unique place to connect and grow the community of practitioners and enablers that are meeting at the nexus between business and charity. For example, SENVIC's Annual Review 2020-2021 notes that of its 700 members, there are 250 associate members from government, business and philanthropy. For government, the network creates opportunities to diversify social procurement spending or to explore social innovation and transform policy approaches to tackle intractable or wicked problems. For business, the networks provide inspiration, demonstrate business innovation through commercially viable social or environmentally sustainable operations, and creative ways for motivating or developing staff or diversifying CSR strategies. For philanthropy, social enterprise is not well understood or recognised. The networks provide opportunities to discover social innovation, and to generate lasting system-level impact by harnessing the collaborative ingenuity of social enterprise networks.

While the social enterprise networks are at differing stages of emergence, ASENA is providing a channel for cooperation, network-building practice, intelligence and resource sharing that is enabling all parts of the national community to benefit from others. Broadly, the networks have five functions:

 amplify and advocate to grow the social enterprise ecosystem into mainstream markets and across the public sector. 
 engage and influence policy makers, institutions, communities and individuals to connect with and enable our social enterprise community. 
 hold events and forums to build community among like-minded people, to create opportunities for collaboration and social innovation. 
 mobilise resources for the benefit of the social enterprise sector, to fill service gaps and reduce individual operating costs, to create streamlined access to support and training. 
 facilitate open communications and knowledge sharing within the community and with those seeking to engage and enable social enterprise to thrive.

The Victorian Government has taken a lead role nationally by releasing the first Social Enterprise Strategy in 2017 and supporting it's independent practitioners-led network (SENVIC) to establish and grow. SENVIC accelerated the maturity and growth of the sector in Victoria and nationally, and took a lead role in the development of the second strategy, the Social Enterprise Strategy 2021-25. In addition to hosting the launch of the strategy to a virtual audience of over 450 viewers, SENVIC has enabled national forums to promote and support engagement with the UN's Sustainable Development Goals in partnership with the United Nations Association.

The Victorian Social Enterprise Strategy 2021-25 received international praise and in June 2022 the Victorian Government received the Catalyst 2030 Government Award.

With government support for the central role of a vibrant and independent practitioner-led network, SENVIC launched its first multi-year strategy in 2022 with an action plan to build a system-shifting network of networks.

National Social Enterprise Strategy 
ASENA's first act was to make a submission to the Prime Minister's Social Impact Investing Taskforce that recommended the Australian Government partner with the sector to develop a national social enterprise strategy, and leverage the achievements of governments in Victoria and Queensland. A collaborative project was then formed coordinated by the English Family Foundation, a philanthropic fund, to begin the sector-led journey to a national strategy. The Yunus Centre at Griffith University conducted research across the social enterprise sector, in Australia and overseas. The research is presented in two parts:

 Part one: a summary of themes, tensions & provocations, capturing the history and learning in the social enterprise sector in Australia and internationally.
 Part two: a possible pathway for building the connective tissue across the Australian social enterprise sector so that collectively we can amplify our impact. It asks us to consider – what would it look like if we were to better organise at a national level?

The Report highlighted the diversity of the sector but confirmed widespread support for a national strategy, shared goals and better coordination in the social enterprise sector. Consultation with the sector commenced in 2022.

In the absence of a national social enterprise census, intermediaries provide an important source of data. The Impact Investment Ready Growth Grant, launched in 2015, noted that the majority of social enterprises were concentrated in three Australian states: Victoria, New South Wales, and Queensland. Recipients of these grants demonstrate that social enterprises work for more than profit alone; they foster social and environmental innovation and are accountable for their employees, consumers and the communities. They offer a business model where people can be given direct voice in running the organisation.

Social enterprises are empowering consumers to make more ethical consumptions decisions. There is a growing trend towards 'voting with your dollar', meaning your purchase decisions have an impact on the community. There are multiple impressive social enterprises based in Australia.

Some of the popular social enterprises in Australia include Thank You, Who Gives a Crap, STREAT, Taboo Period Products, Good Cycles, Vanguard Laundry and Goodwill Wine.

The FASES definition of ‘social enterprise’ is adopted by ASENA and the state and territory networks, with many also welcoming ‘emerging social enterprise’ that have the intention but are yet to meet the eligibility criteria. Social Traders organization in Australia provides the Social Enterprise certification in Australia.

In North America

United States 

The Social Enterprise Alliance defines a "social enterprise" as "Organizations that address a basic unmet need or solve a social or environmental problem through a market-driven approach."

In the U.S, two distinct characteristics differentiate social enterprises from other types of businesses, nonprofits, and government agencies:

 Social enterprises directly address social needs through their products and services or through the numbers of disadvantaged people they employ. This distinguishes them from "socially responsible businesses", which create positive social change indirectly through the practice of corporate social responsibility (e.g., creating and implementing a philanthropic foundation; paying equitable wages to their employees; using environmentally friendly raw materials; providing volunteers to help with community projects).
 Social enterprises use earned revenue strategies to pursue a double or triple bottom line, either alone (as a social sector business, in either the private or the nonprofit sector) or as a significant part of a nonprofit's mixed revenue stream that also includes charitable contributions and public sector subsidies. This distinguishes them from traditional nonprofits, which rely primarily on philanthropic and government support. The double bottom line consists of social goals and profit maximization. Here the two are not contradictory; however, proper financial management to achieve positive profits is necessary in order to undertake the organizations social goals. The triple bottom line is essentially the double bottom line, with the addition of environmental sustainability. It focuses on economic vitality, environmental sustainability, and social responsibility.

In the United States, "social enterprise" is also distinct from "social entrepreneurship", which broadly encompasses such diverse players as B Corp companies, socially responsible investors, "for-benefit" ventures, Fourth Sector organizations, CSR efforts by major corporations, "social innovators" and others. All these types of entities grapple with social needs in a variety of ways, but unless they directly address social needs through their products or services or the numbers of disadvantaged people they employ, they do not qualify as social enterprises.

According to a paper published by De Gruyter in 2019, some common challenges facing social enterprises in the US were - Legal form, governance challenges, difficulties in measuring impact, lack of clear identity, problems in accessing capital, management tensions.

In US, Society Profits offers third-party accreditation to social enterprise businesses.

Canada 

The Social Enterprise Council of Canada (SECC) of Canada defines a "social enterprise" as "businesses owned by nonprofit organizations, that is directly involved in the production and/or selling of goods and services for the blended purpose of generating income and achieving social, cultural, and/or environmental aims. Social enterprises are one more tool for non-profits to use to meet their mission to contribute to healthy communities."

Canadian social enterprise characteristics vary by region and province in the ways they differentiate social enterprises from other types of businesses, not-for-profits, co-operatives and government agencies:

 Social enterprises may directly address social needs through their products and services, the number of people they employ or the use of their financial surplus. This can distinguish them from "socially responsible for-profit businesses", which create positive social change indirectly through the practice of corporate social responsibility (e.g., creating and implementing a charitable foundation; paying fair wages to their employees; using environmentally friendly raw materials; providing volunteers to help with community projects).
 Social enterprises may use earned revenue strategies to pursue a double or triple bottom line, either alone (as a social economy business, in either the private or the not-for-profit sector) or as a significant part of a not-for-profit corporation's mixed income stream that may include charitable contributions and public sector assistance. This distinguishes them from some traditional not-for-profit corporations, which may rely in whole or part on charitable and government support.

Significant regional differences in legislation, financing, support agencies and corporate structures can be seen across Canada as a result of different historical development paths in the social economy. Common regional characteristics can be seen in British Columbia, the Prairies, Ontario, Quebec and Atlantic Canada.

Habitat for Humanity ReStore, Eva's Print Shop and ME to WE are some well known social enterprises operating in Canada. Buy Social Canada is a Canadian organization that offers certification options for social enterprises.

In Asia

Middle East 
There is no separate legal entity for social enterprises in the Middle East. Most social enterprises register as companies or non-profit organizations. There isn't a proper definition of social enterprises by the governments of the Middle Eastern countries.

However, social enterprises in the Middle East are active and innovating in a variety of sectors and industries. A majority of the existing social enterprises are engaged in human capital development. Many are nurturing a cadre of leaders with the experiences and skills needed to enhance the region's global competitiveness while also achieving social goals. Trends in the region point to an increasingly important role and potential for such activities and for social entrepreneurship in general. These include the growing interest among youth in achieving social impact and growth in volunteerism among youth.

According to the Schwab Foundation there are 35 top social entrepreneurs in the Middle East.

South Korea

Legal supports 
In South Korea, the Social Enterprise Promotion Act was approved in December 2006 and was put into effect in July 2007. It was amended in 2010.

Article 2 defines a social enterprise as "an organization which is engaged in business activities of producing and selling goods and services while pursuing a social purpose of enhancing the quality of local residents' life by means of providing social services and creating jobs for the disadvantaged, as an enterprise certified according to the requirements prescribed in Article 7", "the disadvantaged" as "people who have difficulty in purchasing social services necessary to themselves for a market price, the detailed criteria thereof shall be determined by the Presidential Decree", and "social services" as "service in education, health, social welfare, environment and culture and other service proportionate to this, whose area is prescribed by the Presidential Decree".

The Ministry of Labor is obliged to "establish the Basic Plan for Social Enterprises Support" every five years (Article 5), and not only enterprises but also cooperatives and non-profits can be recognised as social enterprises, which are eligible for tax reduction and/or financial supports from the Korean / provincial governments or city councils. 680 entities have been recognised as social enterprises as of October 2012. The majority of Korean social enterprises are primarily concerned with job creation. The Korea Social Enterprise Promotion Agency was established to promote social enterprises, which include Happynarae and Beautiful Store.

China
Researcher Meng Zhao states that the emergence of social enterprise as a concept could be seen around 2012, although it was not yet a well-known idea among the general public or within the media, and the Chinese government was still "trying to understand the new phenomenon".

Zhao identified three forms of social enterprise in China:
the social enterprise
the social startup
the startup for social good.

The terms "startup" is used because it carries some of the spirit associated with "enterprise" in English, such as innovation, risk taking or "venture".

Hong Kong 
There is no separate legal entity for social enterprises in Hong Kong. They are normally registered as companies or non-profit organisations. The Hong Kong Government defines social enterprises as businesses that achieve specific social objectives, and its profits will be principally reinvested in the business for the social objectives that it pursues, rather than distribution to its shareholders. In recent years, venture philanthropy organizations, such as Social Ventures Hong Kong and Social Enterprise Business Centre of the HKCSS, have been set up to invest in viable social enterprises with a significant social impact.

India 
In India, a social enterprise may be a non-profit non-governmental organization (NGO), often registered as a Society under Indian Societies Registration Act, 1860, a Trust registered under various Indian State Trust Acts or a Section 25 Company registered under Indian Companies Act, 1956. India has around 3 million NGOs, including a number of religious organizations and religious trusts, like Temples, Mosque and Gurudwara associations etc., who are not deemed as social enterprises.

NGOs in India raise funds through some services (often fund raising events and community activities) and occasionally products. Despite this, in India the term "social enterprise" is not widely used, instead terms like NGOs and NPOs (non-profit organizations) are used, where these kind of organizations are legally allowed to raise fund for non-business activities. Child Rights and You and Youth United are examples of social enterprise, who raise funds through their services, fund-raising activities (organizing events, donations, and grants) or sometimes products, to further their social and environmental goals.

However, there are social businesses with an aim for making profit, although the primary aim is to alleviate poverty through a sustainable business model. According to Bala Vikasa Social Service Society sister organization of SOPAR-Canada "Social Enterprise is a hybrid business with a goal of solving social problems, while also generating revenues and profits like any other enterprise. However, when it comes to choosing between profits or social cause, social cause is paramount for social enterprises, while profits are considered only for sustainability."

In the agriculture sector, International Development Enterprises has helped pull millions of small farmers out of poverty in India.

Another area of social enterprise in India and the developing world are bottom of the pyramid (BOP) businesses which were identified and analyzed by C. K. Prahalad in "Fortune at the Base of the Pyramid". This seminal work has been a springboard for a robust area of both innovation and academic research.

Malaysia 
Social Enterprise Alliance Malaysia defines social enterprises as "organizations created to address social problems that use business models to sustain themselves financially. Social enterprises seek to create not only financial returns but also social returns to their beneficiaries." Social Enterprise Alliance Malaysia regards social enterprises as businesses with a social focus, distinct from non-profit organisations. In Malaysia, the government initiated several programs that helped Malaysia become a top location for social enterprises. Government bodies like MaGIC have the mission of strengthening Malaysia’s position as an emerging innovation nation. One of MaGIC’s key missions is “nurturing and navigating local startup and social enterprise into successful and sustainable businesses”. One initiative by MaGIC in 2017 is the Impact Driven Enterprise Accreditation (IDEA). MaGIC also launched Buy For Impact which encourages companies to purchase products or services from SEs.

Buy for Impact gathers like-minded people and organisations to promote conscious buying behaviour among the general public and the private sector. This initiative “promotes and supports the notion of utilising the general public’s purchasing power to generate sustainable positive social or environmental impact through Impact-Driven Enterprises (IDEs)”. On April 23, 2022, Prime Minister Datuk Seri Ismail Sabri Yaakob outlined a new direction for the country on social entrepreneurship development. “The newly launched Social Entrepreneurship Action Framework 2030 or SEMy2030 provides a new national direction for the development of social entrepreneurship in Malaysia", remarked the Prime Minister. SEMy2030 will provide a more structured training on the adaptation of technology and digitalisation, widen access to financing and financial support, and provide access to the domestic and international markets.

Philippines 

In December 1999, a group was organized called Social Enterprise Network. Its members, based in Metro Manila, include entrepreneurs, executives, and academics who believe in social entrepreneurship (setting up businesses by creating opportunities for the poor). SEN served is a networking opportunity for like-minded individuals to share their interests and pass on their experience to others. One of its projects eventually was adopted by the Foundations for People Development. It is called the Cooperative Marketing Enterprise. CME is devoted solely to providing the need for cooperatives, micro, small, and medium enterprises for the marketing of their products.

From the academe, a course "Social Entrepreneurship and Management" was first offered at the University of Asia and the Pacific School of Management in 2000. This course was developed and taught by Dr. Jose Rene C. Gayo, then Dean of the School of Management. It was offered as an elective for the senior students of the Bachelor of Science in Entrepreneurial Management. In March 2001, a seminar on "Social Enterprises: Creating Wealth for the Poor" was held at the University of Asia and the Pacific.

A social enterprise in the Philippines is GKonomics International, Inc., a non-stock, non-profit organization, incorporated in 2009. They are a Gawad Kalinga partner in social enterprise development. Their mission is building a new generation of producers.

Thailand 
In Thailand social entrepreneurship is small but growing. Thammasat University in Bangkok is the Southeast Asia partner of the Global Social Venture Competition (GSVC-SEA). Every year new emerging social enterprises present their business model showcasing variety of business models ranging from agriculture, to technology, tourism and education. In 2013 the winners of GSVC-SEA were Wedu (female leadership development and education) and CSA Munching box (agriculture).

A major player in the social entrepreneurship space in Thailand is ChangeFusion, led by the Ashoka Fellow Sunit Shrestha. A major figure in the space is Mechai Viravaidya, founder of the Population and Community Development Association (PDA).

Members of the Royal Family of Thailand have been involved in social entrepreneurship like with the creation of the brand Doi Tung by the Mae Fah Luang Foundation.

Singha Park Chiangrai is also a social enterprise. With eco-agricultural tourism concept as main idea to attract tourists to the 8500-rai park, 1200 unemployed people became employee generating income for local people and their families. This not only helps prevent drugs problem because of constant salary people earns every month, but the park attracts tourist from around the country to visit and spend money in Chiangrai province as well.

The government of Thailand supports the creation of new social enterprises via the Thai Social Entrepreneurship office (TSEO).

In Europe

EMES

The best established European research network in the field, EMES, works with a more articulated definition — a Weberian 'ideal type' rather than a prescriptive definition — which relies on nine criteria:

Economic criteria:

 Continuous activity of the production and/or sale of goods and services (rather than predominantly advisory or grant-giving functions).
 A high level of autonomy: social enterprises are created voluntarily by groups of citizens and are managed by them, and not directly or indirectly by public authorities or private companies, even if they may benefit from grants and donations. Their members have the right to participate ('voice') and to leave the organisation ('exit').
 A significant economic risk: the financial viability of social enterprises depends on the efforts of their members, who have the responsibility of ensuring adequate financial resources, unlike most public institutions.
 Social enterprises' activities require a minimum number of paid workers, although, like traditional non-profit organisations, social enterprises may combine financial and non-financial resources, voluntary and paid work.

Social criteria:

 An explicit aim of community benefit: one of the principal aims of social enterprises is to serve the community or a specific group of people. To the same end, they also promote a sense of social responsibility at local level.
 Citizen initiative: social enterprises are the result of collective dynamics involving people belonging to a community or to a group that shares a certain need or aim. They must maintain this dimension in one form or another.
 Decision making not based on capital ownership: this generally means the principle of 'one member, one vote', or at least a voting power not based on capital shares. Although capital owners in social enterprises play an important role, decision-making rights are shared with other stakeholders.
 Participatory character, involving those affected by the activity: the users of social enterprises' services are represented and participate in their structures. In many cases one of the objectives is to strengthen democracy at local level through economic activity.
 Limited distribution of profit: social enterprises include organisations that totally prohibit profit distribution as well as organisations such as co-operatives, which may distribute their profit only to a limited degree, thus avoiding profit maximising behaviour.

Ongoing research work characterises social enterprises as often having multiple objectives, multiple stakeholders and multiple sources of funding. However, their objectives tend to fall into three categories:
 integration of disadvantaged people through work (work integration social enterprises or WISEs)
 provision of social, community and environmental services
 ethical trading such as fair trade

Despite, and sometimes in contradiction to, such academic work, the term social enterprise is being picked up and used in different ways in various European countries.

European Commission
As part of its Social Business Initiative, which ran from 2011 until 2014, the European Commission developed the following definition based on three key criteria: social objective, limited profit distribution and participatory governance:

Czech Republic 
In the Czech Republic a working party stemming from the development partnerships in the EQUAL programme agreed on the following distinctions (April 2008):

Social economy
It is a complex of autonomous private activities realized by different types of organizations that have the aim to serve their members or local community first of all by doing business. The social economy is oriented on solving issues of unemployment, social coherence and local development. It is created and developed on the base of concept of triple bottom line—economic, social and environmental benefits. Social economy enables citizens to get involved actively in the regional development. Making profit/surplus is desirable, however is not a primary goal. Contingent profit is used in preference for development of activities of organization and for the needs of local community. Internal relations in the social enterprises are headed to the maximum involvement of members/employees in decision-making and self-management while external relations strengthen social capital. Legal form of social economy entities is not decisive—what is crucial is observing public benefit aims as listed in the articles. Subjects of the social economy are social enterprises and organizations supporting their work in the areas of education, consulting and financing.

Social entrepreneurship
Social entrepreneurship develops independent business activities and is active on the market in order to solve issues of employment, social coherence and local development. Its activities support solidarity, social inclusion and growth of social capital mainly on local level with the maximum respect of sustainable development.

Social enterprise
Social enterprise means "a subject of social entrepreneurship", i.e. legal entity or its part or a natural person which fulfils principles of the social enterprise; social enterprise must have appropriate trade license.

The above mentioned definitions stem from the four basic principles that should be followed by social enterprises. Standards with a commentary were settled for each principle. These standards were settled as the minimum so that they should be observed by all legal entities and all types of social enterprises. Specific types of enterprises, that are undergoing pilot verification within CIP EQUAL projects and that are already functioning in the Czech Republic, are social firms employing seriously disadvantaged target groups, and municipal social cooperatives as a suitable form of entrepreneurship with the view of development of local communities and microregions.

The legal form a social enterprise takes may not always be seen as important—however, they must be subject of private law. According to the existing legal system, they can function in a form of cooperatives, civic associations, public benefit associations, church legal entities, Ltd., stock companies and sole traders. Budgetary organizations and municipalities should not be social enterprises as they are not autonomous—they are parts of public administration.

Social entrepreneurship is defined very broadly. Beside employment of the people disadvantaged at the labour market it also includes organizations providing public benefit services in the area of social inclusion and local development including environmental activities, individuals from the disadvantaged groups active in business and also complementary activities of NGOs destined to reinvest profit into the main public benefit activity of an organization. Social entrepreneurship defined in such a wide way should not be directly bound to legal benefits and financial support because the concept of social entrepreneurship might be then threatened by misuse and disintegration. Conditions of eventual legal and financial support should be discussed by experts.

Finland 
In Finland a law was passed in 2004 that defines a social enterprise (sosiaalinen yritys) as being any sort of enterprise that is entered on the relevant register and at least 30% of whose employees are disabled or long-term unemployed. As of March 2007, 91 such enterprises had been registered, the largest with 50 employees. In the UK the more specific term "social firm" is used to distinguish such "integration enterprises". This legal definition of a social enterprise (sosiaalinen yritys) made it hard for actual social entrepreneurship to enter the Finnish consciousness and public debate so a new term Yhteiskunnallinen Yrittäjyys (societal entrepreneurship) was dubbed and promoted by the early players in the field. Nowadays the term is recognized, accepted and even promoted by entrepreneurial NGOs, entrepreneurs themselves, co-operatives and government organisations. Finnish Social Enterprise Research Network FinSERN collects and exchanges national and international research data, maintains connections with social enterprise researchers and research networks around the world, and finds financing opportunities for research. There is also a growing interest in impact investment in Finland.

Italy 
Italy passed a law in 2005 on imprese sociali, to which the government has given form and definition by Legislative Decree no. 155, dated 24 March 2006. Under Italian law a social enterprise is a private entity that provides social utility goods and services, acting for the common interest and not for profit.

In an effort to develop social enterprises and measure social impact, the Italian governmental work placement agency—Italia Lavoro—has developed a method to calculate the social efficiency of their project, from an economic point of view. For example, they measure the economic value to the society of providing a job to a disabled person. Since 1997, Italia Lavoro provides work placements to people with mental and physical disabilities, health problems or socially disadvantaged. To this aim, they help people who have fallen through the cracks of the general work system to reintegrate themselves into society through the creation of small and medium non-profit enterprises.

Also intended to generate more social enterprises is the non-profit cooperative Make a Change. Make a Change provides financial, operational and management support to social start-ups. In 2010, they organized the first edition of a contest to elect the "Social entrepreneur of the year", as well as another contest entitled "The World's Most Beautiful Job". This year's winner of the former was the social cooperative "Cauto", which manages the entire trash life-cycle in the Province of Brescia. One-third of Cauto's workers are disabled or disadvantaged.

The winner of the "World's Most Beautiful Job" prize was the "Tavern of the Good and Bad" project by a group called 'Domus de luna' from Cagliari. The tavern employs mums and children recently graduated from rehabilitation programs. The prize consisted of a grant of €30,000 and 12 months of professional consulting and support. The awards ceremony was included in the program of the Global Entrepreneurship Week.

Spain 

Empresa de insercion

United Kingdom

Definition 
In the UK the accepted Government-backed definition of social enterprise used by the UK social enterprise sector bodies such as Social Enterprise UK and Social Enterprise Mark CIC comes from the 2002 Department of Trade and Industry report 'Social Enterprise: a strategy for success' report as:

The original concept of social enterprise was first developed by Freer Spreckley in 1978, and later included in a publication called Social Audit: A Management Tool for Co-operative Working published in 1981 by Beechwood College. In the original publication the term social enterprise was developed to describe an organisation that uses Social Audit. Freer went on to describe a social enterprise as:

Later on, the three areas of social, environmental and financial benefits used for measuring social enterprise became known as the triple bottom line. Freer later revised the Social Audit in a more structured way.

Twenty years later Spreckley and Cliff Southcombe established the first specialist support organisation in the UK Social Enterprise Partnership Ltd. in March 1997.

In the British context, social enterprises include community enterprises, credit unions, trading arms of charities, employee-owned businesses, co-operatives, development trusts, housing associations, social firms, and leisure trusts.

Whereas conventional businesses distribute their profit among shareholders, in social enterprises the surplus tends to go towards one or more social aims which the business has – for example education for the poor, vocational training for disabled people, environmental issues or for animal rights, although this may not always be the case.

Social enterprises are often seen as distinct from charities (although charities are also increasingly looking at ways of maximising income from trading) and from private sector companies with policies on corporate social responsibility. An emerging view, however, is that social enterprise is a particular type of trading activity that sometimes gives rise to distinct organisation forms reflecting a commitment to social cause working with stakeholders from more than one sector of the economy.

Three common characteristics of social enterprises as defined by Social Enterprise London are:
Enterprise orientation: They are directly involved in producing goods or providing services to a market. They seek to be viable trading organisations, with an operating surplus.
Social aims: They have explicit social aims such as job creation, training or the provision of local services. They have ethical values including a commitment to local capacity building, and they are accountable to their members and the wider community for their social environmental and economic impact.
Social ownership: They are autonomous organisations with governance and ownership structures based on participation by stakeholder groups (users or clients, local community groups etc.) or by trustees. Profits are distributed as profit sharing to stakeholders or used for the benefit of the community.

Some UK social enterprises 
 The Big Issue
 Cafédirect
 Camara
 The Co-operative Group
 Divine Chocolate (Kuapa Kokoo)
 The Eden Project
 Fairfield Materials Management Ltd
 HCT Group
 John Lewis Partnership
 London Symphony Orchestra
 Skoll Centre for Social Entrepreneurship
 Technology Trust
 Two Fingers Brewing Co.
 Welsh Water

Scale 
A survey conducted for the Social Enterprise Unit in 2004 found that there were 15,000 social enterprises in the UK (counting only those that are incorporated as companies limited by guarantee or industrial and provident societies). This is 1.2% of all enterprises in the UK. They employ 450,000 people, of whom two-thirds are full-time, plus a further 300,000 volunteers. Their combined annual turnover is £18 billion, and the median turnover is £285,000. Of this, 84% is from trading. In 2006, the government revised this estimate upwards to 55,000, based on a survey of a sample of owners of businesses with employees, which found that 5% of them define themselves as social enterprises. The most up to date estimates suggest that there are approximately 68,000 social enterprises in the UK, contributing £24 billion to the UK economy.

Using the EU definition of social economy, the annual contribution of social enterprises to the UK economy is four times larger at £98 billion because it includes the contribution of all co-operatives, mutuals and associations that produce goods or services to improve human well-being.

Every two years, Social Enterprise UK carries out and publishes the findings of the state of social enterprise survey, the largest piece of research looking at the UK's social enterprise sector. The most recent report, The People's Business, details the findings of the 2013 survey.

Bodies 
The first agency in the UK—Social Enterprise London (SEL)—was established in 1998 following collaboration between bodies supporting co-operative enterprise. SEL did more than provide support to emerging businesses: it created a community of interest by working with the London Development Agency (LDA) to establish both an undergraduate degree in social enterprise at the University of East London and a Social Enterprise Journal (now managed by Liverpool John Moores University). SEL built a network of over 2,000 social enterprises and social entrepreneurs, directly brokered over 500 social enterprise jobs under the DWP's Future Jobs Fund and delivers consultancy and business support across the world in countries including Vietnam, Korea and Croatia.

The national membership and campaigning body for the social enterprise movement in Britain is Social Enterprise UK (SEUK) (previously the Social Enterprise Coalition), and this liaises with similar groups in each region of England, as well as in Northern Ireland, Scotland and Wales. SEUK's chief executive, Peter Holbrook, joined in January 2010 from the award-winning social enterprise, Sunlight Development Trust, based in Gillingham, Kent. Claire Dove is the Chair of SEUK and runs the social enterprise Blackburne House in Liverpool.

Social Enterprise Mark CIC is the accreditation body responsible for the only internationally available social enterprise accreditation—the Social Enterprise Mark and Social Enterprise Gold Mark. It exists to recognize and promote the capabilities of social enterprises as competitive, sustainable businesses, dedicated to maximizing social impact above shareholder profit. It ensures the social enterprise business model remains ethical, credible and commercial through accreditation. There are over 200 organisations that currently hold Social Enterprise Mark/Gold Mark accreditation. The assessment and accreditation process is overseen by an independent Certification Panel, which ensures that the Social Enterprise Mark/Gold Mark criteria are rigorously applied.

In 2002, the National Council for Voluntary Organisations (NCVO) established the Sustainable Funding Project. Using funds from Futurebuilders England, Centrica and Charity Bank, this project promoted the concept of sustainability through trading to voluntary groups and charities. From 2005 onward, NCVO began using the term social enterprise to refer to voluntary sector trading activities.

In 2002, the British government launched a unified Social Enterprise Strategy, and established a Social Enterprise Unit (SEnU) to co-ordinate its implementation in England and Wales, primarily to consult on a new type of company to support social enterprise development. After a consultation (see CIC below), policy development was increasingly influenced by organisations in the conventional "non-profit" sector rather than those with their origins in employee-ownership and co-operative sectors. The 2003 DTI report on the consultation shows the disproportionate influence of charitable trusts and umbrella organisations in the voluntary sector, and evidence now exists that the voices of progressive employee-owned organisations were marginalised in the course of producing the report.

The Social Enterprise Unit was initially established within the Department of Trade and Industry (DTI), and in 2006 became part of the newly created Office of the Third Sector, under the wing of the Cabinet Office.

Following broad consultation, SEnU adopted a broader definition which is independent of any legal model. This latitudinarian definition could include not only companies limited by guarantee and industrial and provident societies but also companies limited by shares, unincorporated associations, partnerships and sole traders.

In April 2012, Prime Minister David Cameron launched Big Society Capital, the world's first social investment wholesaler. Capitalized with a total of £600 million, it will distribute funds to intermediaries that will lend money to social enterprises, charities and community groups.

Scotland 
In Scotland, social enterprise is a devolved function and is part of the remit of the Scottish Government. Activities are coordinated by the Scottish Social Enterprise Coalition, and intellectual leadership is provided by the Social Enterprise Institute at Heriot-Watt University (Edinburgh), established under the directorship of Declan Jones. Senscot, based in Edinburgh, supports social entrepreneurs through a variety of activities, including a weekly email bulletin by co-founder Lawrence Demarco. The Social Enterprise Academy "deliver leadership, enterprise, and social impact programmes" throughout Scotland, and further support is provided by Development Trusts Association Scotland and Co-operative Development Scotland.

Community Interest Companies 

The UK has also developed a new legal form called the community interest company (CIC). CICs are a new type of limited company designed specifically for those wishing to operate for the benefit of the community rather than for the benefit of the owners of the company. This means that a CIC cannot be formed or used solely for the personal gain of a particular person, or group of people. Legislation caps the level of dividends payable at 35% of profits and returns to individuals are capped at 4% above the bank base rate.

CICs can be limited by shares, or by guarantee, and will have a statutory "asset lock" to prevent the assets and profits being distributed, except as permitted by legislation. This ensures the assets and profits are retained within the CIC for community purposes, or transferred to another asset-locked organisation, such as another CIC or charity. A CIC cannot be formed to support political activities and a company that is a charity cannot be a CIC, unless it gives up its charitable status. However, a charity may apply to register a CIC as a subsidiary company.

Social firms 
Another type of social enterprise category in the UK is a social firm, a business set up specifically to create employment for people otherwise severely disadvantaged in the labour market.

In Africa

Kenya 
In Kenya, many NGOs use business models to improve the lives of people, mainly in rural Kenya. An example of this is KOMAZA, a social enterprise that plants trees with smallholder farmers and uses economies of scale to enable them to access high value markets for processed trees. Another example of this is RISE Kenya that runs projects to mitigate climate change in the semiarid Eastern Province of Kenya. They also run weaving projects whereby women who would traditionally engage in weaving make products that are marketed in the capital city Nairobi and in overseas markets of Europe and America.

Other development-oriented social enterprises in Kenya include the One Acre Fund, Nuru International and Alive & Kicking, which has produced over 200,000 sports balls from its stitching centre in Nairobi. Kenya's social enterprises include M-Pesa, which facilitated economic transactions via mobile phone.

Social enterprise in Kenya has grown to include spaces with IT infrastructure such as internet connectivity and computer hardware. Two of these, the iHub and NaiLab, are centers for technological enterprise, with ventures such as Tandaa in cooperation with the ICT Board of Kenya and Akirachix.

Zambia 
As in much of Africa, social enterprises in Zambia are often focused on the creation of sustainable employment. Alive & Kicking established a stitching centre in Lusaka in 2007, which employs 50 stitchers and produces 2,000 sports balls a month. Zambikes produces a range of bicycles from their Lusaka factory, including 'Zambulances' and ones made from bamboo, and provide three levels of mechanic training.

In Latin America

Chile 

Chile is promoting social inclusion and further development of the private sector through Social Enterprises. Support to social enterprises has been included as part of the Productivity, Innovation and Growth Agenda, which has 47 measures, 10 bills and 37 administrative initiatives with an investment of US$1,500 million between 2014 and 2018.

Social enterprises in Chile adopt various forms like cooperatives, associations, private limited companies or corporations. The Ministry of Economy is developing a law project to create a new legal form through which they will establish the rights and duties for social enterprises.

The Government has launched several initiatives to support social enterprises. For example, the Chilean Economic Development Agency CORFO has implemented programs like the Social Innovation Program and the Seed Subsidy for Flexible Asignation to Support Social Innovation Start-up Program. Through these programs they have provided access to seed capital to social entrepreneurs and financial support to incubators supporting social entrepreneurs. Additionally, the Ministry of Social Development also promoted matching grant funds like Mas por Chile (More for Chile) and Incubia Fund in order to support the development of solutions aiming to reduce poverty and strengthen youth.

See also 
Bottom of the pyramid
Citizen enterprise
Corporate social entrepreneurship
Impact investing
List of social enterprises
Micro-enterprise
MicroConsignment
Mutualism (economic theory)
Public/social/private partnership
Social venture capital

References

Sources
Aiken, M. (2010) "Taking the Long View: Conceptualizing the challenges facing UK third sector organisations in the social and welfare field", in Evers, A. and Zimmer, A. (eds) Turbulent environments: The impact of commercialization on organisational legitimacy and the quality of services. Baden-Baden: Nomos Publishing.
Billis, D. (2010). Hybrid Organizations in the Third Sector. Basingstoke: Palgrave MacMillan.
Borzaga, C. and Defourny, J. (2001). The Emergence of Social Enterprise. London: Routledge.
Dees, J. G., & Anderson, B. B. (2006). Framing A Theory of Social Entrepreneurship: Building On Two Schools Of Practice And Thought. 40–66.
Gergen, Christopher, Gregg Vanourek (2008), Life Entrepreneurs: Ordinary People Creating Extraordinary Lives
Kevin Lynch, Julius Walls, (2009) Mission, Inc.: The Practitioner's Guide to Social Enterprise
Nyssens, M. ed. (2006). Social Enterprises in Europe: Between Market, Public Policies and Communities. London: Routledge.
Pearce, J. (1993). At the Heart of the Community Economy. London: Calouste Gulbenkian Foundation.
Prahalad, CK (2009) Fortune at the Base of the Pyramid: Eradicating Poverty Through Profits
Spear, R. (2001). "United Kingdom: Labour Market Integration and Employment Creation", in Tackling Social Exclusion in Europe, eds. Spear, R., Defourney, J., Favreau, L. & Laville, J-L. Aldershot: Ashgate.
Spreckley, Freer (2011) Social Enterprise Planning Toolkit
Woodin, T., Crook, D., and Carpentier, V. (2010). Community and Mutual Ownership: A historical review. York: Joseph Rowntree Foundation.
Wyler, S. (2009). A History of Community Asset Ownership. London: Development Trusts Association.

 
Business models
Types of business entity
Sustainability
Sustainable development
Ashoka Fellows